Renzo Caramaschi (born 4 March 1946 in Bolzano) is an Italian politician.

He is an independent politician of centre-left and was elected Mayor of Bolzano at the 2016 local elections. He took office on 23 May 2016.

Caramaschi was re-elected for a second term in October 2020.

See also
2016 Italian local elections
2020 Italian local elections
List of mayors of Bolzano

References

External links
 

1946 births
Living people
Mayors of Bolzano
Democratic Party (Italy) politicians
University of Padua alumni